Aurad Assembly constituency, is one of the 224 legislative constituencies of Karnataka Legislative Assembly in Bidar district in the Indian state of Karnataka. It is part of the Bidar Lok Sabha constituency. Since 2008, the seat is reserved for Scheduled castes candidates.

Members of Assembly

Hyderabad State (Hulsur Constituency)

Mysore State (Bhalki Constituency)

Mysore State (Santpur Constituency)

Mysore State (Aurad Constituency)

Karnataka State (Aurad Constituency)

Election Results

2018 Assembly Election
 Prabhu Chauhan (BJP) : 75,061 votes 
 Vijaykumar (Congress) : 64,469
 Dhanaji (JD-S) : 2,605

1985 Assembly Election
 Gurupadappa Nagmarpalli (JNP) : 30,972 votes 
 Bapurao Vithalrao Patil (IND) : 26,504

See also
 Aurad
 Bidar district
 List of constituencies of Karnataka Legislative Assembly

References

Assembly constituencies of Karnataka
Bidar district